is a Japanese footballer currently playing as a midfielder for Nara Club.

Club career
In 2019, Nishida begin first career with J2 club, Zweigen Kanazawa from 2020.

In 2020, he loaned to Iwate Grulla Morioka and loan again to Tegevajaro Miyazaki for 2021 and 2022 respectively.

On 15 December 2022, Nishida officially transfer to J3 Newly promoted, Nara Club for upcoming 2023 season.

Career statistics

Club
.

Notes

References

External links

1998 births
Living people
Japanese footballers
Association football midfielders
Osaka University of Health and Sport Sciences alumni
J2 League players
Zweigen Kanazawa players